Tetrasquillidae is a family of mantis shrimp containing ten genera:
Acaenosquilla Manning, 1991
Allosquilla Manning, 1977
Colubrisquilla Ahyong, 2012
Heterosquilla Manning, 1963
Heterosquilloides Manning, 1966
Heterosquillopsis Moosa, 1991
Kasim Manning, 1995
Pariliacantha Ahyong, 2012
Tectasquilla Adkinson & Hopkins, 1984
Tetrasquilla Manning & Chace, 1990

See also
Heterosquilla tricarinata

References

External links

Stomatopoda
Crustacean families
Taxa named by Raymond B. Manning